Maddie & Tae are an American female country music duo composed of Maddie Font (née Marlow) and Tae Kerr (née Dye), both of whom are singers, songwriters, and guitarists. The duo was signed to the revived Dot Records in 2014. Their debut album, Start Here, was released on August 28, 2015, and includes the singles "Girl in a Country Song", "Fly", "Shut Up and Fish", and "Sierra". Following the closure of Dot, they signed to Mercury Nashville in 2018. They released their second studio album The Way It Feels for this label in April 2020, and the first part of their third studio album, Through The Madness in 2022.

Career

2010–2016: Early beginnings and Start Here
In 2010, Madison Kay "Maddie" Marlow (born 1995, in Sugar Land, Texas) and Taylor Elizabeth "Tae" Dye (born 1995, in Ada, Oklahoma) were both going to the same vocal coach and met at a showcase in Dallas. Within the year, the duo was going back and forth to Nashville every weekend while still going to school. They first performed under the name Sweet Aliana. After finishing high school, the duo moved to Nashville, to begin their musical career as Maddie & Tae. In 2014, Big Machine Records revived the Dot Records name for a new imprint. Maddie & Tae were confirmed as the first signees of the label in June 2014.

They wrote their debut single, "Girl in a Country Song", with Aaron Scherz, who co-produced it with Dann Huff. The song is a criticism of the then-contemporary bro-country trend. "Girl in a Country Song" debuted at number 58 on the Country Airplay chart dated for the week ending July 19, 2014. After 23 weeks, it reached number 1 for the chart dated December 20, 2014, becoming the first debut single by a female duo to reach number one since The Wreckers did it in 2006 with "Leave the Pieces", and only the second in history. Maddie & Tae released their self-titled EP on November 4, 2014. It featured "Girl in a Country Song" as well as 3 new tracks: "Sierra", "Fly", and "Your Side of Town".

"Fly" was released on January 26, 2015. It made its television debut when they performed the song on The Tonight Show Starring Jimmy Fallon. Their debut album, Start Here, was released on August 28, 2015. By October 2015, the song had become a Top 10 hit on both Hot Country Songs and Country Airplay. The duo co-wrote the track "Boomerang" on Jana Kramer's late 2015 album Thirty One. The album's third single, "Shut Up and Fish" released to country radio on November 2, 2015. The album's fourth single, "Sierra", was released to country radio in 2016.

Maddie and Tae guest-starred on the Disney Channel show Girl Meets World in an episode entitled "Girl Meets Texas, Part 2", which premiered on October 17, 2015. They performed at The O2 Arena, on the main stage of the C2C: Country to Country festival in March 2016 – their first visit to the UK. They released a fashion line in collaboration with Bloomingdales in late 2016.

2017–present: The Way It Feels and EP releases
In early 2017, Maddie and Tae appeared on Forbes' 30 Under 30 - Music list at #20. They received two nominations for the 52nd annual Academy of Country Music Awards, including Vocal Duo of the Year. In June 2017, it was announced that Maddie and Tae had signed with UMG Nashville following the closing of Dot Records.

In early 2018, Maddie & Tae signed with Mercury Nashville and released the single "Friends Don't." It has since peaked at number 33 on the Billboard Country Airplay charts.  In October 2018, the duo released another new song, "Die from a Broken Heart", and it sold 7,000 in its first week. The song has reached a peak of number 2 on the US Country Chart and number 1 on Country Airplay chart. This makes the duo's first number one since their debut single. The duo is an opening act on Carrie Underwood's Cry Pretty Tour 360 which began on May 1, 2019. In March 2019, the duo released another promotional single entitled "Tourist in This Town." Their EP One Heart to Another was released on April 26, 2019.

On November 22, 2019, Maddie married Jonah Font after eight years of dating. On February 21, 2020, Tae married songwriter Josh Kerr after over a year of dating. Their second studio album, The Way It Feels, was released on April 10, 2020. A Christmas music EP, We Need Christmas, followed on October 23, 2020. In November 2021, Tae revealed that she and her husband were expecting their first child in the spring of 2022. On January 17, 2022, Tae gave birth to a baby girl, Leighton Grace Kerr, who was born 3 months early.

The first volume of the pair's third studio album, the EP Through the Madness, Vol. 1, was released on January 28, 2022.

Members
 Maddie Font (née Marlow) – lead vocals, right-handed guitar, mandolin
 Tae Kerr (née Dye) – vocals, left-handed guitar

Discography

Studio albums
 Start Here (2015)
 The Way It Feels (2020)

Tours
Headlining
 Start Here Tour (2015)
 Tourist in This Town Tour (2020)
 All Song No Static Tour (2022)

Supporting
 Sounds of Summer Tour (2015) with Dierks Bentley, Kip Moore, & Canaan Smith
 Life Amplified World Tour (2016) with Brad Paisley and Tyler Farr
 Storyteller Tour: Stories in the Round (2016) with Carrie Underwood and Little Big Town and Sam Hunt
 Cry Pretty Tour 360 (2019) with Carrie Underwood and Runaway June

Accolades

References

Country music duos
Country music groups from Tennessee
Dot Records artists
Female musical duos
Living people
Musical groups from Nashville, Tennessee
Musical groups established in 2014
2014 establishments in Tennessee
Mercury Records artists
Year of birth missing (living people)
American musical duos